Guy Pellerin (born August 14, 1971, in Moncton, New Brunswick, Canada) is a Canadian referee in the Quebec Major Junior Hockey League, since the 1994-95 QMJHL season. Pellerin was selected to referee the men's ice hockey at the 2010 Vancouver Olympics. Pellerin has also refereed the Canadian University Championship and the World Junior Championship (U-17) and World Senior Championship (Division 1).

References
 QMJHL profile

1971 births
Canadian ice hockey officials
Ice hockey people from New Brunswick
Living people
Quebec Major Junior Hockey League
Sportspeople from Moncton